Axel Stawski (born 1950/51) is an American billionaire real estate developer and investor, based in New York City.

Early life
His parents, Moniek and Zosia, were both Jewish survivors of the Holocaust. His father, Moniek Stawski (died 2013), was a real estate developer in West Germany, primarily building shopping centres, before emigrating with his family to the US in 1971. He has a bachelor's degree from the University of Birmingham in England, and a PhD in international law from New York University.

He is the second of five children, and has a brother, Dr Mike Stawski, and three sisters, Ester A Stawski, Irene Fogel, and Naomi Atholz.

Career
After the failure of a Long Island shopping centre, Stawski took over the running of the family's properties.

In 1973, he founded Stawski Partners, which now owns six office buildings and three condos, all in Manhattan, including the 30-storey 565 Fifth Avenue.

Personal life
Stawski is married to Galia Meiri Stawski, and they live in Sagaponack, New York.

He is a board member of the American Society for Yad Vashem.

References

1950s births
Living people
American billionaires
20th-century American Jews
American real estate businesspeople
People from Sagaponack, New York
Alumni of the University of Birmingham
New York University alumni
21st-century American Jews